State Road 103 (SR 103), locally known as Lane Avenue, is a state road completely in Jacksonville. It travels from SR 208 north to US 90.

Route description
SR 103 begins at the intersection of Lane Avenue and Wilson Boulevard (SR 208), with SR 103 taking Lane Avenue north as a four-lane street through a mix of residential and commercial areas. The first major intersection is the western terminus of SR 128 (San Juan Avenue), and then the road curves slightly east, becoming a commercial road north of County Road 213 (Lenox Avenue). It is followed by an intersection with SR 228 (Normandy Boulevard) and an interchange with I-10. SR 103 continues north as a commercial and residential mix until it meets its northern terminus, an intersection with US 90.

Major intersections

See also
 
 
 List of state roads in Florida

References

External links

103
103
103